The Casoni test is a skin test used in the diagnosis of hydatid disease. The test involves the intradermal injection of 0.25 ml of sterilised fluid from hydatid cysts/human cyst and sterilised by Seitz filtration on forearm and equal volume of saline injected on the other forearm. Observations made for next 30 mins and after 1 to 2 days. A wheal response occurring at the injection site within 20 minutes is considered positive (immediate hypersensitivity). Delayed hypersensitivity reactions usually read after 18–24 hours. The test is positive in about 90% of cases of hydatid disease affecting the liver, but positive in less than 50% of patients with hydatid disease elsewhere in the body; false positive results are also common. Being a type I hypersensitivity reaction, anaphylactic reaction tray must be kept ready before carrying out the test. Consequently, serological tests are now generally used. The test was described in 1912 by and Tomaso Casoni.

References 

Skin tests
Parasitic diseases